The men's 400 metres at the 2014 IAAF World Indoor Championships took place on 7–8 March 2014.

Records

Qualification standards

Schedule

Results

Heats
Qualification: First 2 in each heat (Q) and the next 2 fastest (q) qualified for the semi-finals.

Semifinals
Qualification: First 3 in each heat (Q) qualified for the finals.

Final

References

400 metres
400 metres at the World Athletics Indoor Championships